Saicheer Wongwirot is a Thai actor, comedian, singer, stuntman and real estate investor. He is also featured in several world class films.

Biography and career
He was born into a poor family in Chiang Rai province whose father is a native of Khorat (Nakhon Ratchasima), his mother is from Maha Sarakham. His family moved to many provinces including Phayao, Samut Prakan and Kamphaeng Phet. His name "Saicheer" is derived from the Asian Highway 12 (known in Thailand as "ทางหลวงสายเอเชีย"; Tang Luang Sai Asia; "Asian Highway Route"). His father gave him this name because he was born in the same year that this highway was built.

He had the opportunity to play in his first film, Rambo III (1988), from seeing newspaper ads for supporting actors.

He has since starred as supporting actor in several famous films as A Moment of Romance (1990), Lara Croft Tomb Raider: The Cradle of Life (2003), Batman Begins (2005), Typhoon (2005), Rescue Dawn (2006), Rambo (2008), Ninja: Shadow of a Tear (2013), Lost in Thailand (2013) or Only God Forgives (2013), while working in Thai films such as Buppah Rahtree (2003), Ghost Station (2007), Rahtree Reborn (2009), Power Kids (2009), Sua Sung Fah (2011) and Bangkok Assassins (2011) etc.

In Thailand, he is famously known in a campaign, which aims to decrease alcohol consumption among poor people, by the Thai Health Promotion Foundation (ThaiHealth) in 2008. He shouted "Jon Kriad Kin Lao" (จน เครียด กินเหล้า; "I'm poor! I'm stressed! So I drink!"). This phrase was repeated several times until the identity, which has afforded by singing the same name. In some other countries, it has become an Internet sensation, particularly in Vietnam.

In family life, Saicheer has three children with a divorced wife. One of his daughters is Talubjai Wongwirot who was a former Thai national youth volleyball player.

Filmography

Dramas

Series

Sitcom

Film

Advertising

References

External links
 

Living people
1969 births
Saicheer Wongwirot
Saicheer Wongwirot
Saicheer Wongwirot
Saicheer Wongwirot
Saicheer Wongwirot
Saicheer Wongwirot
Saicheer Wongwirot
Saicheer Wongwirot
Saicheer Wongwirot